Nemophila is a genus found in the flowering plant family Boraginaceae.

Most of the species in Nemophila contain the phrase "baby blue eyes" in their common names. N. menziesii has the common name of "baby blue eyes". N. parviflora is called the "smallflower baby blue-eyes" and N. spatulata is called the "Sierra baby blue eyes". An exception to this naming tendency is N. maculata, whose common name is fivespot.

Nemophila species are mainly native to the western United States, though some species are also found in Mexico, and in the southeastern United States. They are commonly offered for sale for garden cultivation. Generally these are Nemophila menziesii.

Description
All species of Nemophila are annuals, and most bloom in the spring. Their flowers have five petals and are bell or cup-shaped, and purple, blue, or white in color, often spotted or marked. The stamens are included and there is only one ovary chamber.

The leaves are simple, with an opposite or alternate arrangement. The petiole is generally bristly. The leaf blade is pinnately toothed or lobed.

The fruit is 2–7 mm wide and generally enclosed by the calyx. The fruit itself is spherical to ovoid in shape. It is also hairy.

The seeds are ovoid, smooth, wrinkled or pitted. At one end there is a colorless, conic appendage.

Occurrence
Generally the genus is native to United States of America, (they are found within the states of Alabama, Arkansas, California, Colorado, Delaware, Florida, Georgia, Idaho, Illinois, Kentucky, Louisiana, Maryland, Mississippi, Montana, Nevada, North Carolina, Oklahoma, Oregon, South Carolina, Tennessee, Texas, Utah, Virginia, Washington, West Virginia and Wyoming), Canada (they are found within the provinces of Alberta and British Columbia) and Mexico.

Some of the species of Nemophila are of restricted range. For example, Nemophila menziesii has been observed only in western North America, but chiefly in California. Nemophila heterophylla occurs in a more restricted range within northern and central California (with some proximate state populations); N. heterophylla has the greatest number of sightings Marin County at locations such as Ring Mountain.

EtymologyNemophila means "woodland-loving", from the Greek words νέμος (némos) meaning wooded pasture, glade and philos, which means "loving".

Species
There are 13 accepted Species in Nemophila, according to Plants of the World Online, Kew;Nemophila aphylla: Smallflower baby blue eyesNemophila breviflora: Great Basin nemophila, Basin nemophilaNemophila heterophylla: Small baby blue eyes,Nemophila hoplandensis: Nemophila kirtleyi:  Kirtley's nemophilaNemophila maculata:  Fivespot, five-spotNemophila menziesii: Baby blue eyesNemophila parviflora: Smallflower nemophila, small-flowered nemophilaNemophila pedunculata: Littlefoot nemophila, meadow nemophilaNemophila phacelioides: Largeflower baby blue eyesNemophila pulchella: Eastwood's nemophila, Eastwood's baby blue eyesNemophila sayersensis  :Nemophila spatulata: Sierra nemophila, Sierra baby blue eyesN. menziesii, N. parviflora, and N. pulchella'' have varieties under each species.

References

External links

Jepson Flora Project (1993): Nemophila
Calflora

 
Boraginaceae genera
Flora of the Northwestern United States
Flora of Illinois
Flora of the Southwestern United States
Flora of Texas
Flora of the Southeastern United States
Flora of Northwestern Mexico